This is a list of Indigenous Australian performing artists.

Circus
 Con Colleano - tightrope walker

Comedy
 Mark Bin Bakar - actor and comedian

Dance
 Stephen Page   
 Frances Rings

Film, television and theatre
 Kylie Belling - actor
 Shareena Clanton - actor
 Ernie Dingo - actor and television presenter   
 Steve Dodd - actor
 Karla Grant - presenter
 Stan Grant - television presenter   
 David Gulpilil - actor 
 Leila Gurruwiwi - television presenter, producer
 Grant Hansen - television presenter   
 Tom E. Lewis - actor, musician 
 Rachael Maza - actor and director
 Gilbert McAdam - television presenter 
 Deborah Mailman - actor  
 Madeleine Madden - actor
 Aaron Pedersen - actor
 Hunter Page-Lochard - actor, writer, director, television presenter, dancer
 Leah Purcell - actor   
 Rhoda Roberts - actress, director and arts executive
 Everlyn Sampi - actor   
 Justine Saunders - actor     
 Ivan Sen - filmmaker 
Mark Coles Smith - actor, musician
 Miranda Tapsell - actor, television presenter
 Noel Tovey - actor    
 Robert Tudawali - actor   
 Richard Walley - actor, musician 
 Brandon Walters - actor  
 Sam Watson - novelist and filmmaker
 Burnum Burnum - actor

Indigenous performing arts training institutes
Aboriginal Centre for the Performing Arts
Aboriginal Islander Dance Theatre
NAISDA (National Aboriginal and Islander Skills Development Association) Dance College

Indigenous performing arts companies 

 Bangarra Dance Theatre

See also
List of Indigenous Australian musicians   
List of Indigenous Australian writers
List of Indigenous Australian visual artists

Performing
 
Performing artists